The Lieutenant Governor of Guernsey is the representative of the British monarch in the Bailiwick of Guernsey, a Crown dependency of the British Crown. The role of the Lieutenant Governor is to act as the de facto head of state in Guernsey and as liaison between the governments of Guernsey and the United Kingdom. The holder of this office is also ex officio a member of the States of Guernsey but may not vote and, by convention, speaks in the Chamber only on appointment and on departure from post. The duties are primarily diplomatic and ceremonial. He has the authority to appointment two members of the board of governors of Elizabeth College and the Priaulx Library.

The Lieutenant Governor has his own flag in Guernsey, the Union Flag defaced with the Bailiwick's coat of arms.

History
The Crown appointed Wardens or Keepers to represent its interests in the Channel Islands. After 1473 separate Wardens were appointed for Guernsey and Jersey, the title of Captain or Governor also being used. Around the early 17th century the title of Governor was settled upon, although those appointed to the position of Governor adopted the practice of appointing a lieutenant to carry out their duties in their absence. By the 19th century the post of Governor of Guernsey had become a sinecure and the position was abolished in 1835. Since then Lieutenant Governors have continued to be appointed.

In 2010 it was announced that the next Lieutenant-Governor would be recommended to the Crown by a Guernsey panel consisting of the Bailiff of Guernsey, the Seigneur of Sark, and the President of the States of Alderney, sitting with a human resources professional. This new system replaced the previous system of the appointment being made by the Crown on the recommendation of UK ministers. The first person selected by this process was former RAF officer Air Marshal Peter Walker, who was sworn in on 15 April 2011.

A roll of honour of the Governors and Lieutenant Governors of Guernsey from 1198 to date has been installed at Government House.

List of lieutenant governors of Guernsey
1689-1690: Colonel Sidney Godolphin  
1704-1708: Sir Edmund Andros

See also
 List of Bailiffs of Guernsey
 List of Governors of Guernsey
 List of Bailiffs of Jersey
 List of Lieutenant Governors of Jersey

References

Sources
 

Government of Guernsey
Lieutenant Governor